Włodzimierz Smoliński (born 3 January 1938) is a Polish wrestler. He competed in the men's Greco-Roman light heavyweight at the 1960 Summer Olympics.

References

1938 births
Living people
Polish male sport wrestlers
Olympic wrestlers of Poland
Wrestlers at the 1960 Summer Olympics
Sportspeople from Masovian Voivodeship
People from Warsaw Voivodeship (1919–1939)